Xu Shihui (born 1958) is a Chinese billionaire businessman. He is the founder and chairman of Dali Foods Group, a food and drink company.

Early life
Xu Shihui was born in China.

Career
Xu Shihui is the chairman of Dali Foods Group since 2014, and chairman of Fujian Dali Foods Group since 1992.

As of December 2020, Forbes estimated his net worth at US$8.8 billion.

Xu Shihui, his wife Chen Liling, and daughter Xu Yangyang own 85% of Dali Foods Group, through their family company, Divine Foods. Xu Shihui owns 50% of Divine, Chen Liling 10%, and Xu Yangyang 40%.

Personal life
He is married and lives in Quanzhou, China.

References

1958 births
Living people
Billionaires from Fujian
Businesspeople from Fujian
People from Quanzhou
Chinese company founders
Chinese food industry businesspeople